The 2005 All-Ireland Senior Ladies' Football Championship Final featured  and . It was Cork's first final and Galway's third. Galway were also the reigning champions, having won the 2004 final. Galway led 0–4 to 0–3 at half-time, but Player of the Match, Valerie Mulcahy, subsequently scored 1–5 to help Cork win their first All-Ireland title. Cork eventually won 1–11 to 0–8. It was also the first of five consecutive All-Ireland finals that Cork would win between 2005 and 2009.

The Galway team featured Annette Clarke as well as Claire Molloy, a future Ireland women's rugby union international, and Niamh Fahey, a future Republic of Ireland women's association football international.

Match info

Teams

References

!
All-Ireland Senior Ladies' Football Championship Finals
All-Ireland
Cork county ladies' football team matches
Galway county ladies' football team matches